Malaysia–Seychelles relations refers to bilateral foreign relations between Malaysia and Seychelles. Seychelles had a high commission in Subang Jaya but was later closed and replaced by an honorary consulate.

History 

The history of Malays in Seychelles can be traced back during the British colonial period when a group of Malay warriors from Perak together with their Sultan, Abdullah Muhammad Shah II been deported to the island in 1877 after allegedly being involved in a successful assassination attempt on J.W.W. Birch.

Economic relations 
In 1986, Seychelles brought around U$600,000 Malaysian products directly but purchased U$7 million through indirect trade with Singapore, thus the country are looking for a direct trade with Malaysia to get Malaysian products without using Singapore ports. In 1988, an agreement to promote co-operation in the fields of culture, education, sports and information was signed. Malaysia main exports to Seychelles are wood products and known as one of the main provider of raw material to the islands while Seychelles mainly exports canned tuna and fish to Malaysia. Several Malaysian companies have invested in the island such as the Berjaya Group which owned two hotels and Promet Bhd. in a property development project comprising shop offices, a retail complex and office block. Seychelles has announced its desire to send its students to study in Malaysia and invited more Malaysian investors to invested in the country. In 2014, Malaysia is one of Seychellois partners for Seychelles to remain in tourism industry. Both governments has signed a debt relief agreement and Seychellois who visit Malaysia are not require to carry their visa for up to 30 days.

References 

 
Seychelles
Bilateral relations of Seychelles
Seychelles
Malaysia